Carl Gustav Alexander, Freiherr von Simolin (b. May 10, 1715 in Turku - d. Aug. 27, 1777 in Spa), brother of Johann Matthias von Simolin, was a Russian diplomat. 

He was assigned to political missions early on and was particularly active in 1743 in the peace negotiations in Turku. In 1756 he went to Courland as Minister for Empress Elisabeth, a post he held with great skill under the most difficult circumstances until the end of his life. King  Stanislaus Augustus made him and his brother a baron. He died 1777 as a Russian Active State Councillor in Spa.

Sources

18th-century diplomats of the Russian Empire
Barons of Poland
People from Turku
Estonian people of Finnish descent
1715 births
1777 deaths